Castles is a book by David Day, David Larkin, and Alan Lee published in 1984.

Plot summary
Castles is a book details castles from history, myth, and fantasy with narrative text by David Day and drawings and paintings by Alan Lee.

Reception
Dave Langford reviewed Castles for White Dwarf #60, and stated that "Castles is constrained by subject matter: a castle is a castle, and despite Lee's evident skill – especially at far-off vistas – there are only so many changes to be rung."

Reviews
Review by Fritz Leiber (1984) in Locus, #285 October 1984
Review by Debbie Notkin (1984) in Locus, #286 November 1984
Review by Don D'Ammassa (1985) in Science Fiction Chronicle, #64 January 1985
Review by Algis Budrys (1985) in The Magazine of Fantasy & Science Fiction, February 1985
Review by Brian Stableford (1985) in Fantasy Review, February 1985
Review by Patrick L. Price and Roger Raupp (1985) in Amazing Stories, March 1985
Review by Tom Easton (1985) in Analog Science Fiction/Science Fact, May 1985
Review by Barbara Davies (1986) in Vector 130

References

Castles